Connecticut's 104th House of Representatives district elects one member of the Connecticut House of Representatives. It consists of the city of Ansonia and parts of Derby. It has been represented by Democrat Kara Rochelle since 2019.

Recent elections

2020

2018

2016

2014

2012

References

104